The following is a list of recurring Saturday Night Live characters and sketches introduced between October 1, 2005, and May 20, 2006, the thirty-first season of SNL.

Voice Recording Woman
Rachel Dratch plays Julie, a woman who provides the voice for automated speech recognition systems used by "companies such as United Airlines, Blue Cross and Amtrak." She interacts with other people in the same fashion as the automated system; for example, after she prompts her date to "please say your age" and he responds that he's 29, she says, "I think you said 19. Did I get that right?"

Appearances

Deep House Dish
DJ Dynasty Handbag (Kenan Thompson) and co-host Tiara Zee (Rachel Dratch), replaced in December 2006 by T'Shane (Andy Samberg), host a showcase for house music acts. Both Tiara and T'Shane appear to have mental difficulties, perhaps from heavy drug use, and are berated constantly by DJ Dynasty Handbag.

Each sketch features that week's SNL host, along with various cast members, as musical performers.

Appearances

Vincent Price's Holiday Special
Bill Hader plays a caricature of horror actor Vincent Price, hosting a cheesy (and invariably botched) holiday special.

Appearances

The dress rehearsal for the May 20, 2006, episode, hosted by Kevin Spacey, included a Memorial Day version of this sketch that featured Spacey as Jack Lemmon, Wiig as Carol Channing, and Sanz as Alfred Hitchcock in a commercial for Psycho, but the sketch was cut for the live episode. The dress rehearsal for the October 28, 2006, episode, hosted by Hugh Laurie, featured a Halloween 1960 version of the sketch, but was also cut for the live episode.

Target Lady
Kristen Wiig plays a nerdy, dowdy, rather dim middle-aged woman, who is extremely proud to be a Target cashier. She has an awestruck reverence for her employer, although she struggles to comprehend some basic facts, such as understanding that its logo (referred to as "the Target circles") represents a stylized bullseye. She speaks with a strange, unidentifiable accent, pronouncing long vowel sounds with an extra "r"; for example, "Target" becomes "Terget." (When Justin Timberlake complains that his lips are chapped and swollen, she remarks that it makes him look like "Angelina Jerlerr".)

As she rings up each customer, she becomes enamored with one of the items they're purchasing and rushes off into the store to find one herself, while the puzzled customer waits. She particularly loves candles ("kerndels"), and any customer with a candle among their purchases will send her into a giddy, babbling flutter.

The character was inspired by a brief conversation between Wiig and a clerk at a Los Angeles Target store, although Wiig said she was influenced by "just the accent, nothing [the clerk] actually said." Wiig originated the character while at The Groundlings, and performed it as part of her audition for SNL in 2005. "When I first did the Target lady at Groundlings, it was just a black box and me," she said in an interview. "And then the first time I showed up on set and there was a Target set with a cash register, I teared up a little bit."

Appearances

The dress rehearsal for the April 14, 2007, episode, hosted by Shia LaBeouf, included a sketch in which LaBeouf played a Target cafe clerk who scared customers with ghost stories, but the sketch was cut for the live episode.

Two A-Holes
Jason Sudeikis and Kristen Wiig portray two nameless "assholes," a preppy self-absorbed couple who love chewing gum, pop culture references, and completely ignoring the people around them. The male a-hole is a fast-talking, Bluetooth-wearing guy who does most of the talking, showering questions at his companion, whom he addresses as "babe." The female a-hole stares at her phone while absentmindedly playing with her hair, occasionally whining and performing a celebrity "impression" that is impressive only to her other half.

The sketches are written by Wiig and Sudeikis, with occasional help from John Lutz. Sudeikis described the characters' origin:One night, we were just sort of writing late ... I said, "Hey, we should write a scene about a couple trying to buy a tree." And then, popped in the gum to just sort of stay awake. Kristen says that she sort of played that character because she didn't want to be there. I then played a variation of a guy I know exists in the world, you know, he loves her deeply, but is a jerk to other people.

One of Wiig's lines in the sketch's first appearance, "He looked like a rabbit," became a recurring joke in later sketches. According to Sudeikis, Wiig wrote the original line, which Sudeikis didn't understand and "was not that into," but he agreed to keep it after Lutz advocated for it.

Appearances

Mike and Lexie
Mike (Fred Armisen) and his daughter Lexie (Scarlett Johansson) star in a crudely produced commercial for Mike's boutique store specializing in some gaudy item, claiming that if you display an item from their store in your home, "people will think you're a millionaire or somethin'." Each iteration features a new version of the catchphrase, "Ya gotta get a chand-a-lee-eh!"

Appearances

Introverts' Night Out
Neil (Will Forte), Jean (Kristen Wiig) and the host are a group of stiff, socially awkward coworkers who attempt to have a night out at a bar, though they are clearly uncomfortable and unfamiliar with the social situations they find themselves in. Regardless, they attempt to navigate through the bar's social scene as best they can. The sketch ends with them spending the entire night at the bar and doing something extremely unexpected, given the introverted nature of their characters.

This sketch was intended to debut in an episode hosted by Natalie Portman (airdate March 4, 2006), but it was cut after the dress rehearsal. The script was then eventually reused a few episodes later.

Appearances

Natalie Raps
Natalie Portman raps during interviews about her scandalous activities and shedding her good girl image.

Appearances

References

Lists of recurring Saturday Night Live characters and sketches
Saturday Night Live in the 2000s
Saturday Night Live
Saturday Night Live